Kevin Callahan (born February 18, 1955) is an American college football coach who is the head football coach at Monmouth University in West Long Branch, New Jersey. Callahan was the first and is the only head coach in history of the Monmouth Hawks football program. He was hired by Monmouth in August 1992. The team's first season was in 1993 and Callahan led them to a 2–5 record.

Head coaching record

References

External links
 Monmouth profile

1955 births
Living people
Albany Great Danes football coaches
Colgate Raiders football coaches
Monmouth Hawks football coaches
Syracuse Orange football coaches
Rochester Yellowjackets football players
Wagner Seahawks football coaches
Sportspeople from Elmira, New York
Coaches of American football from New York (state)
Players of American football from New York (state)